B. J. McLeod Motorsports is an American professional stock car racing team that currently competes full-time in the NASCAR Xfinity Series. The team is owned by B. J. McLeod and his wife Jessica. The team currently fields the No. 78 full-time for Anthony Alfredo and the No. 99 part-time for Garrett Smithley.

Founding

On February 3, 2016, team owner B. J. McLeod said that the team fielded two full-time cars, including the No. 78 Ford Mustang driven by himself. Batteries Plus Bulbs sponsored the car for three races in 2016.

On October 23, 2020, McLeod and Matt Tifft purchased Archie St. Hilare's half of Go Fas Racing's charter. McLeod, Tifft, and Joe Falk used the charter to form Live Fast Motorsports as a full-time Cup team in 2021. Although McLeod became Live Fast's driver, B. J. McLeod Motorsports continued to operate as an Xfinity team. On April 26, 2021, the team returned with the 55 with fellow Xfinity driver Matt Mills.

Cup Series

Car No. 55 history
Although Live Fast Motorsports replaced the team's Cup operations, the team announced that they would return to compete in the Buschy McBusch Race 400 at Kansas Speedway with the team's Xfinity Series driver, Matt Mills. The team would be renumbered to the No. 55 due to Live Fast Motorsports bearing the No. 78. Mills finished 38th, 12 laps down.

Car No. 55 results

Car No. 78 history
In 2020, it was announced that B. J. McLeod would make his first attempt in the NASCAR Cup Series at Darlington. B. J. McLeod would drive his own No. 78 Chevy to a 39th-place finish in the team's Cup debut. He improved to a 36th-place finish at the next race at Darlington. The No. 78 switched to a Ford for the next three races before running a Chevy again at Atlanta. The No. 78 skipped the next two races (Withdrawing from both events) and returned with Garrett Smithley behind the wheel at Talladega, where he scored a 34th-place finish. After that, B. J. McLeod returned to the No. 78 for the two Pocono races, and Indianapolis, where he scored a season-best 22nd-place finish.

The team's Cup operations were replaced by Live Fast Motorsports in 2021.

Car No. 78 results

Xfinity Series

Car No. 5 history

Matt Mills was announced as the full-time driver of the No. 8 in 2019, though the number was changed to 5 after JR Motorsports acquired No. 8 from McLeod. Mills would drive for the first 19 races of the season, driving a mix of Chevy's and Toyota's, only getting four top 20's, and 1 top 10 at Daytona. He would be replaced at Watkins Glen by road course ace Scott Heckert who would finish 13th. Vinnie Miller would drive the car at Mid-Ohio and would finish 25th a lap down. Mills would return to the No. 5 at Bristol.

In 2020, Mills returned for full season while Miller drove at Road America and Darlington.

In 2021, Mills drove the No. 5 car for majority of the season while drivers such as Kevin Harvick, Andy Lally, James Davison, Stefan Parsons, and Mason Massey shared the ride.

In 2022, Mills will run a handful of races whilst Rev Racing ARCA Menards Series star Nick Sanchez, Scott Heckert, Stewart Haas-based Ryan Preece, Joe Graf Jr., and Stefan Parsons drove the rounds Mills wasn't entered in.

Car No. 5 Results

Car No. 8 history

In 2017, it was announced that Jeff Green would drive the No. 8 full-time. The team used owner points of the No. 99 from last year, so the team needed to qualify in the Top-33 to make the field. As Green had a Past Champion Provisional, he was locked in the field for the season opener at Daytona. The number was expected to be the No. 15, but Green asked to renumber to No. 8 because he and his brother David Green had both used it in the past. Despite the initial announcement of a full-time campaign for Green, Matt Mills brought sponsorship from Thompson Electric and he drove the car at Phoenix and Richmond. After Charlotte, B. J. McLeod started driving the No. 8 in every race besides the Daytona July race when Green returned to the team for one race. Josh Bilicki drove the No. 8 at the road course races. Tommy Joe Martins drove at Richmond's fall race and Caesar Bacarella ran the final two races (Phoenix and Homestead-Miami) for the team.

In 2018, the team returned once again with multiple drivers behind the wheel. Caesar Bacarella, Tommy Joe Martins, Ray Black Jr., Bayley Currey, Blake Jones, Angela Ruch, Scott Heckert and Cody Ware shared the car.

Car No. 8 Results

Car No. 15 history
Todd Peck attempted three of the first four races of the 2016 season (Atlanta Motor Speedway, Las Vegas Motor Speedway and Phoenix International Raceway) with the No. 99 but he only was able to make the field at Atlanta. At Phoenix, Ryan Ellis made the field but crashed his only car for the weekend in the No. 15 for Rick Ware Racing, so they called Peck to make the race with his former No. 99, renumbered as the No. 15 car. After this, RWR and B. J. McLeod Motorsports started a partnership to share the No. 15 car full-time. McLeod fielded the car for Peck, Blake Jones, Cody Ware, Travis Kvapil, Timmy Hill, Scott Heckert, Josh Wise, Jeff Green, Stanton Barrett, Michael Lira, Clint King, Josh Reaume and D. J. Kennington. Kvapil recorded a best finish of 20th at Bristol.

Car No. 15 Results

Car No. 55 history
In 2022, the team fielded the No. 55 car for Matt Mills at Richmond Raceway and Charlotte Motor Speedway.

Car No. 55 Results

Car No. 76 history
In 2021, the team fielded the No. 76 car for Stefan Parsons at Charlotte Motor Speedway.

Car No. 76 Results

Car No. 78 history

Team owner McLeod drove this car as an owner-driver in 2016. He made the first ten races and scored one top twenty finish, a nineteenth at Dover International Speedway. McLeod also had two engine failures, at Auto Club and Talladega Superspeedway.

In 2017, the team returned with Clint King in the two first races of the season. McLeod returned at Las Vegas. At Charlotte Jeff Green went to the No. 78 for a one-race deal but failed to qualify. Jordan Anderson, Tommy Joe Martins,  Angela Ruch, John Graham, Josh Bilicki and Jennifer Jo Cobb have driven the No. 78. Stephen Young drove the No. 78 at the road course races.

In 2018, the team returned once again with multiple drivers behind the wheel. Ryan Ellis, McLeod, Ray Black Jr., Tommy Joe Martins, Blake Jones, Scott Heckert, and Jairo Avila Jr. shared the car. Vinnie Miller took over the No. 78 car for the remainder of the 2018 season and a full schedule in 2019 and 2020, although he was replaced at Mid-Ohio with Scott Heckert.

In 2021, Jesse Little would drive the No. 78 car for the majority of the season while Ellis, Andy Lally, Mason Massey, Stefan Parsons, Akinori Ogata, and Sheldon Creed shared the ride.

In 2022, Josh Williams would drive the No. 78 full-time. After Indy Road Course Williams left the team and he was replaced by multiple drivers such as Mills, Heckert, Brandon Brown, Parsons, McLeod, and Garrett Smithley. 

In 2023, B.J. McLeod Motorsports announced that Anthony Alfredo would join the team as the full-time driver in the No. 78 Chevrolet.

Car No. 78 Results

Car No. 90 history
In 2015, McLeod fielded a part-time team in partner with King Autosport, sharing the owner points of the 90/92 team. In 2016, Todd Peck returned to the No. 90 team at the Richmond spring race.

Car No. 90 Results

Car No. 99 history

In 2016, the No. 99 car entered Daytona with Chris Fontaine at the wheel, missing the show. The car qualified the following week at Atlanta, with Todd Peck driving. However, Peck also failed to qualify the car in two races. The No. 99 team shut down the rest of the season because they missed most of their races. They returned at Road America with Stanton Barrett. The team returned as the No. 25 at the second Kentucky race, because Chris Cockrum crashed the only car he had for the weekend. Peck replaced him the No. 25 (McLeod's third entry, Blake Jones was in the No. 15, and McLeod in the No. 78). The No. 99 returned at Kansas, Phoenix and Homestead with Jeff Green.

In February 2017, it was announced that David Starr would drive the No. 99 Chevrolet Camaro with help from SS-Green Light Racing full-time with sponsorship Striping Technology and Whataburger. The No. 99 used the owner points from the No. 15 from last year to make the field in the first three races. Despite a slow start to the season, Starr recorded a fifth-place finish at the July Daytona race; Starr was originally not entered in the race, as the No. 99 had been scheduled to be driven by Korbin Forrister, but Forrister came down with the flu and Starr was summoned from Texas to race at Daytona.

On January 20, 2018, Ray Black Jr. was announced to drive the No. 99 car starting at Daytona. However, without SS-Green Light Racing's help, the team became part-time. Black attempt the season-opener at Daytona but failed to qualify. B. J. McLeod start and parked the car at Charlotte. Ray Black returned at July's Daytona race and finished 22nd.

In late 2018, Stephen Leicht drove the No. 99 part-time.

In 2019, the team would field for McLeod, Tommy Joe Martins, Jairo Avila Jr., D. J. Kennington, Ryan Ellis, Stefan Parsons, Cody Ware, Todd Peck, Patrick Gallagher, and C. J. McLaughlin. The team usually ran Toyota Supras while the No. 78 and No. 5 usually ran Chevrolet Camaros. Martins would leave the #99 after New Hampshire.

In 2023, Garrett Smithley was announced to drive No. 78 car full-time. However, it was announced in January that he will move to the No. 99 car. Smithley left the team following the race at Las Vegas and joined DGM Racing to drive the No. 91 instead.

Car No. 99 Results

Camping World Truck Series
Note: Christopher Long is listed as the owner for these races.

Truck No. 0 history
Matt Tifft made one start with this truck, at Martinsville Speedway in 2014. He finished an eighth-place finish, the team's best finish.

Truck No. 35 history
Tommy Regan made one start in this truck, at Martinsville in 2015.

Truck No. 45 history
Regan debuted this truck in 2014, making one start with it at Iowa Speedway. Tifft made two starts in it later in the season. Chris Fontaine ran this number for the Eldora Speedway race in 2015 and also ran in Talladega late in the season. McLeod made ten other starts, receiving funding from Tilted Kilt Pub & Eatery. Regan also made two starts with the truck at Iowa and Gateway.

Truck No. 78 history
McLeod ran this truck for two races in 2011, with a best finish of 20th at Nashville its team debut in NASCAR. He also made one race with this truck in 2013. Tommy Regan returned at Texas (fall) in 2016 but failed to qualify.

References

External links
 
 

Stock car racing
American auto racing teams
NASCAR teams